The 2009–10 Montenegrin Cup was the fourth season of the Montenegrin knockout football tournament. The winner of the tournament received a berth in the second qualifying round of the 2010–11 UEFA Europa League. The defending champions were Petrovac, who beat Lovćen in the final of the 2008–09 competition. The competition featured 30 teams. It started on 16 September 2009 and ended with the final on 19 May 2010.

First round
The 14 matches played on 16 September 2009.

Summary

|}

Matches

Bracket

Second round
The 14 winners from the First Round and last year's cup finalists, Petrovac and Lovćen, competed in this round. Starting with this round, all rounds of the competition were two-leg except for the final. The first legs of these matches were played on 21 October 2009 and the second legs on 4 November 2009.

Summary

|}

First legs

Second legs

Quarter-finals
The eight winners from the Second Round competed in this round. The first legs took place on 25 November 2009 and the second legs took place on 9 December 2009.

Summary

|}

First legs

Second legs

Semi-finals
The four winners from the Quarter-finals competed in this round. The first legs took place on 14 April 2010 and the second legs took place on 28 April 2010.

Summary

|}

First legs

Second legs

Final

References

External links
Montenegrin Cup 2009-2010 (pages 57-62) at Football Association of Montenegro's official site
Montenegrin Cup 2009-2010 at Soccerway
Montenegrin Cup 2009-2010 at RSSSF

Montenegrin Cup seasons
Montenegrin Cup
Cup